Walter Blake  was an Irish Roman Catholic bishop in the mid 18th Century: he was Roman Catholic Bishop of Achonry from 1739 to 1758.

References

1758 deaths
18th-century Roman Catholic bishops in Ireland
Roman Catholic bishops of Achonry